City of Scars, also known as Batman: City of Scars, is a 2010 superhero fan film produced by Aaron and Sean Schoenke, starring Kevin Porter as Batman, and based on the Batman franchise. The film had a budget of $27,000 and was shot in 21 days. The 30-minute short film is partly set in Arkham Asylum.

City of Scars was followed by the 2011 sequel Seeds of Arkham and the 2021 film Batman: Dying Is Easy.

Plot
The Joker escapes from Arkham Asylum, spraying Joker venom in a nurse's face as he runs and putting her in intensive care. Upon arriving in Gotham City, he kidnaps Councilman Johnson and his son shortly after brutally murdering the Councilman's wife. Determined not to let his archenemy kill anyone else, Batman hunts him through the city. After Councilman Johnson is found dead while his son remains in The Joker's captivity, Batman questions whether his crusade against evil does more bad than good. Batman tracks The Joker to a carnival, where he thwarts the villain's plot of bombing a ferris wheel. He then races to the location of The Joker and the councilman's son, but when the young boy kills The Joker with his own gun, Batman debates if his greatest nemesis' death is a step toward Gotham's peace, or rather a sign that things are getting worse.

Cast
 Kevin Porter as Batman/Bruce Wayne
 Paul Molnar as The Joker
 Christopher Parker as Detective Crispus Allen
 Guy Grundy as Victor Zsasz
 Katie Joy Horwitch as Renee Montoya
 Jay Caputo as Arnold Wesker/Scarface
 Madelynn Rae as Harleen Quinzel/Harley Quinn
 Tess Kielhamer as Black Canary

Background

Filmmaker Aaron Schoenke is a long-time Batman fan, having earlier created two fan film shorts about the subject: Patient J in 2005 and Batman Legends in 2006.

References

External links
 
 City of Scars on Dailymotion
 

2010 films
2010 action films
2010 independent films
2010 short films
2010s American films
2010s English-language films
2010s superhero films
American action films
American independent films
American films about revenge
Fan films based on Batman
Films released on YouTube
Films set in amusement parks
Films set in psychiatric hospitals
Films shot in Los Angeles